Arild Olsen (born 14 January 1952) is a Norwegian footballer. He played in two matches for the Norway national football team from 1976 to 1979.

References

External links
 

1952 births
Living people
Norwegian footballers
Norway international footballers
Place of birth missing (living people)
Association footballers not categorized by position